John Robert Cherry III (October 11, 1948 – May 8, 2022) was an American film director and screenwriter, most notable for creating the character of Ernest P. Worrell, played by Jim Varney.

Career

A native of Nashville, Tennessee, Cherry attended the Ringling School of Art and Design in Sarasota, Florida.

He was the executive vice president and co-namesake of the Nashville-based Carden and Cherry advertising agency, for which the "Ernest" character was developed. He based the character on a man who worked for his father, about whom Cherry said, that he thought he knew everything but did not know anything. 

Ernest was portrayed for 15 years by Jim Varney, who at the time of the character's debut was an up-and-coming stand-up comic; after a string of successful commercials and sketches, Cherry directed a television series (Hey, Vern! It's Ernest) and several movies. Cherry made three cameo appearances in his own films: in Slam Dunk Ernest as a basketball spectator, Ernest Goes to Africa as a customer, and in Ernest in the Army as Sergeant Ben Kovsky. In addition to Varney, Cherry also introduced the comic duo of Chuck and Bobby (Gailard Sartain and Bill Byrge respectively), who were integrated into the Ernest films as supporting characters.

Cherry retired the Ernest character after Varney's declining health made it impossible for him to continue in the role (Varney died in 2000). He directed two other films without Ernest: For Love or Mummy, a collaboration with Larry Harmon that sought to reintroduce the long-deceased Laurel and Hardy comic team with new actors (with Hardy portrayed by Sartain); and Pirates of the Plain, for which Cherry had intended to include Varney but could not.

Personal life
Cherry had three children from two marriages. His son Josh appeared in Ernest in the Army as Corporal Davis.

Cherry died from Parkinson's disease on May 8, 2022, aged 73.

Director
 1983 Knowhutimean? Hey Vern, It's My Family Album
 1985 Dr. Otto and the Riddle of the Gloom Beam
 1986 The Ernest Film Festival (video)
 1987 Ernest Goes to Camp
 1987 Hey, Vern, Win $10,000 (video)
 1988 Ernest Saves Christmas
 1990 Ernest Goes to Jail
 1991 Ernest Scared Stupid
 1993 Ernest Rides Again
 1995 Slam Dunk Ernest
 1997 Ernest Goes to Africa
 1998 Ernest in the Army
 1999 The All New Adventures of Laurel & Hardy in For Love or Mummy
 1999 Pirates of the Plain
 2009 Stake Out (video short)
 2009 Denton Wants His Mummy (video short)
 2009 Denton Rose Paranormal Levitation Trick (video short)
 2011 Denton Rose's Short's (video)

Actor
 1997 Ernest Goes to Africa as Customer
 1998 Ernest in the Army as Sergeant Ben Kovsky

References

External links

1948 births
20th-century American screenwriters
21st-century American screenwriters
American male screenwriters
Deaths from Parkinson's disease
Film directors from Tennessee
Film producers from Tennessee
People from Franklin, Tennessee
Screenwriters from Tennessee
Writers from Nashville, Tennessee

2022 deaths